Ghislaine Marie-Rose Edith Alexander (née Dresselhuys; 7 January 1922 – 25 April 2000) was a wealthy heiress and British socialite who was a panelist on the British version of What's My Line?.

Life and times
Alexander was the only daughter of Cornelius William Dresselhuys and Edith Merandon du Plessis, born at the Dutch consulate in London, where her father was consul. Her parents divorced when Ghislaine was young, and her mother married newspaper publisher Lord Kemsley, who became Alexander's stepfather. She was married three times, first to Major Denis Alexander, 6th Earl of Caledon, then to Henry Cubitt, 4th Baron Ashcombe; both marriages ended in divorce. At the time of her death she was married to Adrian Foley, 8th Baron Foley, a former composer and pianist.

Tall and attractive, often described as one of the most beautiful women in the world, Ghislaine Alexander became famous for her appearances as a panelist on Britain's What's My Line? television quiz show, where her charm made her a favourite of British audiences. Her choice in clothes became a topic of fashion columns of the press. She had been a fashion journalist and had modelled for women's magazines such as Vogue and Women's Illustrated. Alexander was also a hostess for the major personalities of the time. Among those attending her parties were the King of Jordan, Ian Fleming, Douglas Fairbanks Jr, David Niven, Charles Addams and members of the British Royal Family. Likewise, no "chic" party would be complete without her.

A caricature of her appeared briefly in Disney's 1961 release of 101 Dalmatians.

In October 2009 two dresses worn by Alexander, one in 1934 the other in 1938, were purchased by the Bath Fashion Museum in Bath, Somerset, England, for £101,365.

American connections
Alexander had close connections to the United States. She spent much of her youth in Palm Beach, Florida, where her parents, Lord and Lady Kemsley, had a home. Then as Lady Foley she resided in Beverly Hills. Alexander was a regular visitor to New York. On 10 January 1954, she appeared on the American version of What's My Line?, first as a mystery guest, then joining the panel for the second round. Her arrival for the show was reported in Ed Sullivan's newspaper column. Americans began to name their baby girls Ghislaine.

In 1969, while Ghislaine, now Lady Ashecombe, was staying at the Colony Hotel in Palm Beach she visited the hotel jeweler who was showing a diamond to a group of people. Thinking the diamond looked familiar, she discovered that it had been the diamond her late father, Cornelius Dresselhuys, had purchased for her late stepmother, Lorraine Manville. The jeweler had just purchased it from her stepmother's estate and was selling the 52-carat canary diamond for an asking price of $4,250,000.

References

External links
UK Telegraph Obituary

1922 births
2000 deaths
Foley
English socialites
English fashion journalists
English women journalists
English television personalities
20th-century English women writers
Ghislaine
English people of Dutch descent